The Pacific Catamaran or Pacific Cat is a sailing catamaran capable of high speeds across open water.

PC-19
Newport Boats and Mobjack Manufacturing began building the Pacific Cat PC-19 in 1960. It has a fiberglass hull with fractional sloop standing rigging and running rigging. This sailboat did not have a cabin but rather a well for the comfort and safety of passengers.

Length: 
Beam: 711 inches
Draft: 2 feet 11 inches
Sail area: 
Displacement: 540 pounds

See also
 List of multihulls

References

Newport Sailboats

Catamarans
Sailboat types built by Newport Boats
Sailboat types built by Mobjack Manufacturing